Masroor Colony is a neighbourhood of Keamari Town in Karachi, Sindh, Pakistan. 

 
Neighbourhoods of Karachi